The Lumberman was a 3-masted schooner that sank in 1893 in Lake Michigan off the coast of Oak Creek, Wisconsin, United States. In 2009 the shipwreck site was added to the National Register of Historic Places.

History
The Lumberman was built in 1862 in the shipyard of Allyne Litchfield at Blendon's Landing, Michigan. She was a 3-masted schooner with a wooden hull 126.5 feet long. For thirty years, she carried forest products like lumber, bark and shingles from logging outposts on the shores of Lake Michigan to markets like Chicago.

On April 6, 1893, heading from Chicago to Whitefish Bay to pick up a load of ties, the vessel sank in a fast-moving storm. Much of the ship's equipment and the crew's personal effects have been salvaged, but the ship itself remains largely intact and is a popular site for divers and archaeologists. She is of particular interest to marine archaeologists because of the double centerboard she was equipped with, since the reasons for fitting two centerboards in some lake schooners and one in others has been lost.

References

1862 ships
Shipwrecks of Lake Michigan
Shipwrecks of the Wisconsin coast
Shipwrecks on the National Register of Historic Places in Wisconsin
National Register of Historic Places in Milwaukee County, Wisconsin
Ships built in Michigan
Wreck diving sites